The 1792 Delaware gubernatorial election was held on October 2, 1792. It was the first popular election for the state's chief executive; under the 1776 constitution, the President of Delaware was elected by the legislature. Incumbent President Joshua Clayton ran for re-election. He was nominated by the Federalist Party and was opposed by two Anti-Federalists, Thomas Montgomery and George Mitchell. He won re-election by a decisive margin, but fell short of a majority.

General election

Results

References

Bibliography
 
 
 

1792
Delaware
Gubernatorial